Sankt Kanzian am Klopeiner See is a municipality in the district of Völkermarkt in the Austrian state of Carinthia.

Geography
Sankt Kanzian lies in the Jaun valley south of the Völkermarkt Reservoir about 7 km from Völkermarkt.

References

Cities and towns in Völkermarkt District